Interfront was a pro-communist political movement that aimed to preserve the Soviet Union as a unified Marxist–Leninist state and strongly opposed the pro-independence movements in the republics. It had branches in Estonia, Latvia, Lithuania, Moldova, Ukraine and other union republics.

Branches
Intermovement – the Estonian branch
International Front of the Working People of Latvia – the Latvian branch
Yedinstvo – the Lithuanian branch
Unity Movement for Equality in Rights – the Moldavian branch, founder of Transnistria
Interfront of the Donbass – the Ukrainian branch

Opposition
 Popular Front of Estonia
 People's Movement of Ukraine
 Rastokhez

See also
Dissolution of the Soviet Union
Soviet Union Soyuz, pro-Russian Soyuz in Crimea

External links
 Ivanov, V. Penalty kick "Down with referee!". Online center of Russians Abroad "Russkie.org". 13 December 2010
 The Donbas Intermovement, at the source of our struggle (Интердвижение Донбасса: у истоков нашей борьбы). "Газеты ДНР" © by Министерство информации ДНР ("DPR Ministry of Information"). 13 November 2019

Dissolution of the Soviet Union
Organizations of the Revolutions of 1989
Political movements in the Soviet Union
Political organizations based in the Soviet Union
Post-Soviet states